Breathitt may refer to:

Breathitt County, Kentucky, county located in the U.S. state of Kentucky
Jackson, Kentucky, the seat of Breathitt Co., originally known as Breathitt
Breathitt Parkway, controlled-access highway from Henderson to Hopkinsville, Kentucky
Edward T. Breathitt (1924–2003), politician from the US state of Kentucky
John Breathitt (1786–1834), the 11th Governor of Kentucky

See also
Breathe (disambiguation)